Chai tow kway is a common dish or dim sum of Teochew cuisine in Chaoshan, China. It is also popular in Indonesia, Singapore, Malaysia, Thailand, Taiwan and Vietnam, consisting of stir-fried cubes of radish cake.

Ingredients
It is made with radish cake (steamed rice flour, water, and shredded white daikon), which is then stir-fried with eggs, preserved radish, and other seasonings. The radish cake is often served in large rectangular slabs which are steamed and then later fried whole.

Alternatives to chai tow kway include those made of taro or solely of rice flour.

The radish cake can also be eaten on its own, either just steamed, or steamed and then pan-fried, as opposed to the steamed then wok-fried with other ingredients in chai tow kway. Both the steamed and pan-fried varieties are commonly served topped with spring onions.

Variations
The versions served by hawkers in Johor and Singapore, where Teochew people live, are typically prepared by frying the daikon cake with chopped preserved turnip, diced garlic, eggs, and Chinese fish sauce in place of soya sauce. Chopped spring onion is added just before serving. Northwards (e.g. in Kuala Lumpur), the same dish is darker due to the use of dark soya sauce, and bean sprouts are added.

In Singapore, however, it is more commonly cut into pieces and stir fried with eggs, garlic, spring onion and occasionally shrimp (both dried and fresh). There are two variants: the "white" version does not use sweet soy sauce, and the radish cake is fried on top of a beaten egg to form a crust; the "black" version uses sweet sauce (molasses), and the egg is simply mixed in with the radish cake.

Cultural importance
The dish is very popular particularly in Singapore and Malaysia, where it is enjoyed by people of different dialect groups and races, not just the Teochews, and is served in a range of establishments ranging from the simplest hawkers to the most expensive Chinese restaurants. It is a much-loved local comfort food in the region, and can be consumed at various times of the day; it goes from being a breakfast dish, to a main lunch dish, to a late-night supper dish. Many public figures are also known to have a fondness for the dish. Notably, the Singapore politician Chan Chun Sing declared his love for the dish in one of his speeches, specifying a preference of a particular variant of the dish (the "S$10 XO sauce chye tow kuay"), as opposed to the one commonly found in hawker centres and coffee shops, thus illustrating the many variations of the dish available in the region.

See also

 Turnip cake, a similar variety of Cantonese dim sum, using the same lobak (more commonly known as daikon) and rice flour
 Bánh bột chiên

References

Dim sum
Teochew cuisine
Malaysian cuisine
Singaporean cuisine
Vegetable dishes
Thai cuisine